Highway 761 is a highway in the Canadian province of Saskatchewan. It runs from Highway 668 to Highway 6 near Leroy.

Highway 761 passes through town of Lanigan; it also has a spur that is also signed as Highway 761 that links it to Highway 20 in Drake. Access to Leroy Leisureland Regional Park is from Highway 761.

See also 
Roads in Saskatchewan
Transportation in Saskatchewan

References 

777